Eugenics manifesto was the name given to an article supporting eugenics, published in 1939 in the journal Nature, entitled Social Biology and Population Improvement. The signatories are listed below.

In 2004, John Glad wrote that the document denounced Hitler's racism and the economic and political conditions that create antagonism between the races."The Second World War had already begun, and the authors explicitly decried antagonism between races and theories according to which certain good or bad genes are the monopoly of certain peoples."

Signatories
The 23 British and American men who signed the manifesto are listed below.
Francis Albert Eley Crew
Cyril Dean Darlington
John Burdon Sanderson Haldane
S. C. Harland
Lancelot T. Hogben
Julian S. Huxley
Hermann Joseph Muller
Joseph Needham
G. P. Child
P. R. David
Gunnar Dahlberg
Theodosius Dobzhansky
Rollins Adams Emerson
C. Gordon
J. Hammond
Charles Leonard Huskins
Peo Charles Koller
Walter Landauer
Harold Henry Plough
Bronson Price
J. Schultz
Arthur G. Steinberg
Conrad Hal Waddington

References

External links
Social Biology and Population Improvement by Google Books
Social Biology and Population Improvement by Nature

Eugenics
1939 documents